Wentworth College is a private secondary college in Gulf Harbour, in the Auckland region of New Zealand. Wentworth Primary is a private primary school which shares the site.

Primary
The primary services years one to six with a low school roll of just  students.

College
Wentworth College is the older, more commonly known secondary (years 7–13) part of the school with a roll of  students.

Education examinations
In 2008, Wentworth College decided to transition from the New Zealand examination standard, National Certificate of Educational Achievement (NCEA), to the University of Cambridge International Examinations (CIE).
The first group of students completed their IGCSE level (year 11) in 2009; these students then progressed onto their AS level which they completed at the end of 2010. These students then went on to finish and complete the A-levels at the end of 2011. The Class of 2011 were the first transitioned, CIE students to graduate the College and were the first to receive Wentworth College Diplomas.
the entire school has been on the Cambridge standard since 2011.

International students
Wentworth College constantly has international students in its specialized courses. These students come from all over the world, with the majority from Asia. Wentworth also participates in student exchange programs when requested by students to do so. 
Countries that students have come from include South Korea, China, Japan, Taiwan, Argentina, the United States of America and Norway. 
Large school trips are also welcomed, with Wentworth students adopting a student each for a week to their home and providing them with insight to life in New Zealand.

Operation and history
Both of the facilities are privately owned and operated. The primary and secondary parts of the school work close together on all aspects of the school life, sharing one principal, Bruce Tong. Second in command was Steve Wackrow until 2011. The current Head of College is Philip Lee.

The college opened in 2003. 
The primary opened in February 2008 on the same site.

Government reviews and ratings
Both of the facilities have a decile rating of 10. Both also have a very positive Education Review Office (ERO) report. The latest College Report was conducted in October 2009. The first Primary report in August 2008.

References

External links
 Wentworth Start-Page

Hibiscus and Bays Local Board Area
Secondary schools in Auckland
Private schools in New Zealand
Cambridge schools in New Zealand
Educational institutions established in 2003
2003 establishments in New Zealand